Alan Paul Biley (born 26 February 1957) is an English former footballer who played in the Football League for Brighton & Hove Albion, Cambridge United, Derby County, Everton, Portsmouth and Stoke City.

Playing career
Biley was born in Leighton Buzzard and began his career with Luton Town's youth team before joining Cambridge United in 1975. He became a prolific goalscorer for Cambridge which saw him net 82 goals in 185 matches which brought the attention of bigger clubs. First Division Derby County signed him in 1979 and he took to the top-flight well scoring nine goals in 18 matches but Derby were relegated. He remained with the "Rams" for the 1980–81 season scoring 10 goals as they finished in 6th position. Biley was then signed by Everton but he had a frustrating spell at Goodison Park scoring just three goals in 21 and left before the end of the 1981–82 for Stoke City. He played eight matches for Stoke scoring once which came in a 4–3 defeat away at Southampton.

Biley then signed for Bobby Campbell's Portsmouth in 1982. He became a hugely popular figure at Fratton Park helping the South Coast side to the Third Division title in 1982–83. After scoring 65 goals in 119 games for Pompey he left for Brighton & Hove Albion where he spent two seasons and then a short return to Cambridge United. After a brief spell at Panionios he ended his career with a brief spell at Waterford United where he was signed by ex teammate Andy King. Biley made his League of Ireland debut on 15 January 1989 at Cork City but only made one other appearance for Waterford.

Managerial career
Biley was appointed manager of Eastern Counties League club Ely City in 1998 after the club had finished as runners-up in the league the previous season. However, the club were relegated at the end of the 1998–99 season, after which Biley resigned. He later managed Potton United and Barton Rovers before resigning after four months to take over at Diss Town.

After leaving Diss, he managed Spalding United, from October  to December 2002, later joining Wootton Blue Cross as assistant manager in June 2003.

In February 2004, Biley joined Kettering Town as assistant manager, working under his former Derby County colleague Kevin Wilson. Biley had two spells as assistant manager of Kettering, separated by a short spell as caretaker manager of Spalding United in February 2006, before taking over as manager of Rothwell Town in November 2006.

He resigned from his post at Rothwell in May 2007. In 2007, Biley was once again re-united with Wilson as he became assistant manager of Corby Town, however, following a bad run on the back end of the year. In 2008, he went back to Spalding for a fourth time as manager; Spalding were on the verge of relegation to the United Counties League, but Biley kept them in the Northern Premier League. On 3 January 2014 Biley became assistant manager at struggling Southern League Premier Division club Bedford Town.

Career statistics
Source:

A.  The "Other" column constitutes appearances and goals in the Anglo-Scottish Cup.

Honours
 Cambridge United
 Football League Third Division runner-up: 1977–78
 Football League Fourth Division champions: 1976–77

 Portsmouth
 Football League Third Division champions: 1982–83

References

External links
 
 Alan Biley Everton profile

Living people
1957 births
People from Leighton Buzzard
English footballers
Luton Town F.C. players
Cambridge United F.C. players
Derby County F.C. players
Everton F.C. players
Stoke City F.C. players
Portsmouth F.C. players
Brighton & Hove Albion F.C. players
Panionios F.C. players
Waterford F.C. players
League of Ireland players
English Football League players
English football managers
Ely City F.C. managers
Potton United F.C. managers
Barton Rovers F.C. managers
Diss Town F.C. managers
Spalding United F.C. managers
Rothwell Town F.C. managers
Hemel Hempstead Town F.C. managers
Association football forwards
Footballers from Bedfordshire